Croton pottsii is a species of plant known by the common name leatherweed. It is native to the southwestern United States and northern Mexico.

Description
Croton pottsii is a perennial forb with ovate to elliptic shaped leaves, which are dusty green in color due to the presence of stellate hairs. The flowers can be unisexual or bisexual and lack petals.

The species is named for John Potts, manager of the Chihuahua Mint.

References

External links
USDA Plants Profile: Croton pottsii (leatherweed)
SEINet Arizona - New Mexico Chapter: Croton pottsii

pottsii
Flora of Arizona
Flora of New Mexico
Flora of Texas
Flora of Mexico